100% is a studio album from Lotta Engberg, released in March 1988. The album was recorded in KMH Studio in Stockholm, Sweden in January–February 1988. The album peaked at number 40 on the Swedish Albums Chart.

Track listing

Contributing musicians
Vocals: Lotta Engberg
drums: Per Lindvall
Bass: Rutger Gunnarsson
Guitar: Lasse Wellander

Charts

References

External links 

 

1988 albums
Lotta Engberg albums
Swedish-language albums